Cavaleiro Negro is a 1923 Brazilian silent adventure film directed by Luiz de Barros.  
The film premiered in Rio de Janeiro on 15 January 1923

Cast
Augusto Aníbal   
Manuel F. Araujo   
Antônia Denegri   
Alvaro Fonseca   
Alfredo Marzullo   
Francisco Pezzi

External links
 

1923 films
Brazilian black-and-white films
1923 adventure films
Brazilian silent films
Films directed by Luiz de Barros
Brazilian adventure films